Welan gum is an exopolysaccharide used as a rheology modifier in industrial applications such as cement manufacturing. It is produced by fermentation of sugar by bacteria of the genus Alcaligenes. The molecule consists of repeating tetrasaccharide units with single branches of L-mannose or L-rhamnose. In solution, the gum exhibits viscosity retention at elevated temperature, and is stable in a wide pH range, in the presence of calcium ion, and with high concentration of glycols.

See also
Gellan gum
Xanthan gum

References

External links

Polysaccharides
Natural gums